Kunnonny is a village at the foothills of Western Ghats in the Kottayam district of Kerala state, India. It is about 50 km from Kottayam and about 3 km from Poonjar. Pala, Kanjirappally, Erattupetta and Poonjar are the nearest cities of Kunnonny. Kunnonny is primarily an agricultural village and most people plant Rubber. The population is about 2500. Most of them are farmers and daily wage workers. Recently a lot of people have left from here for work outside Kerala and India. The population consists of Hindus and Christians. A very old prominent Ayyappa temple (Sree Dharma Sastha temple dedicated to Lord Ayyappa worshiped as Dharma Sastha) and a church (St. Joseph's Roman Catholic church) are there in Kunnonny. The St. Joseph's U P School is managed by the church.

See also
Poonjar
Kottayam
Kerala

References

External links

http://kottayam.nic.in/

Villages in Kottayam district